Transversotrema elegans is a species of trematodes found from species of the labrid genus Choerodon on Heron Island and Lizard Island. It is characterised by its number of vitelline follicles enclosed by its cyclocoel and by the size of its testicle.

References

External links

Trematodes parasiting fish
Plagiorchiida
Animals described in 2010